Fiľakovské Kováče is a village and municipality in the Lučenec District in the Banská Bystrica Region of Slovakia.

History
In historical records, the village was first mentioned in 1246 (1246 Cuach, 1295 Koachy, 1454 Kowachy). It belonged to Fil’akovo town. In 1548 it was destroyed by Turks. From 1938 to 1945 it belonged to Hungary.

Genealogical resources

The records for genealogical research are available at the state archive "Statny Archiv in Banska Bystrica, Slovakia"

 Roman Catholic church records (births/marriages/deaths): 1700-1893 (parish B)
 Lutheran church records (births/marriages/deaths): 1783-1895 (parish B)

See also
 List of municipalities and towns in Slovakia

External links
https://web.archive.org/web/20070927203415/http://www.statistics.sk/mosmis/eng/run.html 
http://www.e-obce.sk/obec/filakovskekovace/filakovske-kovace.html
Surnames of living people in Filakovske Kovace

Villages and municipalities in Lučenec District